Chanodichthys is a genus of cyprinid freshwater fish, consisting of five species from eastern Asia (China, Mongolia, Russia and Vietnam). The name is derived from the Greek word chanos, meaning "abyss, mouth opened, inmensity", and the Greek word ichthys, meaning "fish". Chanodichthys is closely related to Culter and some species have been moved between these genera.

Species
 Chanodichthys abramoides (Dybowski, 1872)
 Chanodichthys dabryi (Bleeker, 1871) (Humpback)
 Chanodichthys erythropterus (Basilewsky, 1855) (Predatory carp)
 Chanodichthys mongolicus (Basilewsky, 1855) (Mongolian redfin)
 Chanodichthys oxycephalus (Bleeker, 1871)

References
 
 

 
Fish of Asia